Lun Thi (born 18 July 1940) is a Burmese politician and retired Brigadier-General. He previously served as a member of the Pyithu Hluttaw, representing Yangon Region's Kungyangon Township. He also previously served as the Minister for Energy of Myanmar.

References

Union Solidarity and Development Party politicians
Members of Pyithu Hluttaw
Defence Services Academy alumni
1940 births
Living people
Government ministers of Myanmar